Events from the year 1938 in Ireland.

Incumbents
 President: Douglas Hyde (from 25 June 1938)
 Taoiseach: Éamon de Valera (FF)

Events
 17 January – the Ford Motor Company in Cork City produces its 25,000th car to be built there.
 13 April – the Department of Local Government & Public Health reports that cases of typhoid and diphtheria have reduced; however, infant deaths have increased.
 21 April – Douglas Hyde is selected unanimously by the two main political parties to serve as the first President of Ireland.
 25 April – Anglo-Irish Trade Agreement, signed between Ireland and the United Kingdom in London, settles the Anglo-Irish Trade War and agrees to the Royal Navy abandoning the British sovereign bases at the Irish Treaty Ports in return for a one-off payment of £10 million.
 10 May – the Government makes an order converting the "Saorstát pound" to the "Irish pound" as part of the new constitutional reforms.
 24 May – the new Anti-Partition Party takes eight seats in a Unionist-controlled Londonderry Corporation.
 17 June – 1938 Irish general election: Fianna Fáil under Éamon de Valera retain power, winning the first overall majority in the history of the State. Members of the 10th Dáil assemble on 30 June.
 25 June – Douglas Hyde is formally inaugurated as the first President of Ireland.
 11 July–3 October – Military installations at the Treaty Ports in the Republic (Berehaven, Spike Island at Queenstown, and Lough Swilly) are handed over from British control to the Government of Ireland, under terms of the Anglo-Irish Trade Agreement.
 8 August – Dublin Corporation purchases 16 sets of traffic lights.
 21 August – the £50,000 20,000-seat Cusack Stand is officially opened at Gaelic Athletic Association headquarters in Croke Park.
 12 September – Éamon de Valera is elected President of the Assembly of the League of Nations in Geneva.
 17 December – the Gaelic Athletic Association confirms that the President of Ireland, Douglas Hyde, will cease to be a patron of the organisation because of his attendance at an international soccer match.

Arts and literature
19 August – W. B. Yeats' drama Purgatory is premiered at the Abbey Theatre, Dublin.
 Samuel Beckett publishes his novel Murphy.
 Cecil Day-Lewis publishes Overtures to Death, and Other Poems.
 Oliver St. John Gogarty publishes his poetry Others to Adorn, with a preface by W. B. Yeats.
 Louis MacNeice publishes I Crossed the Minch and his poetry The Earth Compels.
 Colin Middleton first exhibits at the Royal Hibernian Academy.
 Ewart Milne publishes his poetry Forty North Fifty West, with woodcuts by Cecil Salkeld.
 Kate O'Brien publishes her novel Pray for the Wanderer.
 W. B. Yeats publishes New Poems, including "Lapis Lazuli".

Sport

Football
League of Ireland
Winners: Shamrock Rovers
FAI Cup
Winners: St James' Gate 2–1 Dundalk

Golf
Irish Open is won by Bobby Locke (South Africa).

Births

January to June
4 January – Jim Norton, character actor.
30 January – Mick Lanigan, Fianna Fáil Senator.
2 February
John Moriarty, writer and philosopher (died 2007).
Detta O'Cathain, Baroness O'Cathain, businesswoman and Conservative politician in Britain (died 2021). 
27 March – Owen Dudley Edwards, historian and writer.
4 April – Declan Mulligan, rock guitarist.
29 April – Ray MacSharry, Tánaiste, Fianna Fáil TD, Cabinet Minister and European Commissioner.
2 May – Douglas Goodwin, cricketer.
13 May – Patrick Dineen, cricketer.
15 June – Mary Turner, trade unionist in Britain (died 2017).

July to December
2 July – John McDonnell, head coach for the University of Arkansas Razorbacks track team. (died 2021)
15 July – Andy McEvoy, soccer player (died 1994).
July – Seán Ó Cionnaith, Workers' Party politician (died 2003).
1 August – Paddy Moloney, traditional musician with The Chieftains (died 2021).
3 August – Terry Wogan, BBC, previously RTÉ, broadcaster (died 2016).
5 October – Frank Patterson, tenor (died 2000).
16 October – Gerry Collins, Fianna Fáil TD for Limerick West, Cabinet Minister and Member of the European Parliament.
29 October – John Kirby, Roman Catholic Bishop of Clonfert.
31 October – Anne Buttimer, geographer (died 2017).
28 December – Frank Kelly, actor (died 2016).

Full date unknown
John Behan, sculptor.
Gerald Davis, artist (died 2005).
Pa Dillon, Kilkenny hurler (died 2013).
Jim Lane, Irish republican and socialist.
Úna O'Connor, camogie player (died 2020).

Deaths
24 February – Thomas Gann, doctor, archaeologist and writer (born 1867).
3 June – John Flanagan, three-time Olympic gold medalist in the hammer throw (born 1873).
27 July – Tom Crean, Antarctic explorer and publican (born 1877).
4 August – William Moxley, representative from Illinois' 6th congressional district (born 1851).
8 September – Robert Henry Woods, Irish Unionist MP (born 1865).
21 October – Sir John Purser Griffith, member of the Seanad.
7 November – James Murray Irwin, British Army doctor (born 1858).
12 December – James McNeill, politician and second Governor-General of the Irish Free State (born 1869).

References

 
1930s in Ireland
Ireland
Years of the 20th century in Ireland